The following is the list of film, television and theatre credits of American actress Cloris Leachman. She appeared in films including Butch Cassidy and the Sundance Kid (1969), The Last Picture Show (1971), Young Frankenstein (1974), Yesterday (1981), A Troll in Central Park (1994), Now and Then (1995), Spanglish (2004), New York, I Love You (2008), and The Croods (2013). Her television work included her reoccurring role on The Mary Tyler Moore Show (1970–1975) which then led to her own spinoff, Phyllis (1975–1977). She starred in the ABC Afterschool Special The Woman Who Willed a Miracle in 1983 and appeared on The Facts of Life (1986–1988), Malcolm in the Middle (2001–2006), and Raising Hope (2010–2014).

Film

{| class="wikitable sortable"
! Year
! Title
! Role
! class="unsortable" | Notes
|-
| 1947
| Carnegie Hall
| Dancing Nightclub Patron
|Uncredited
|-
| 1955
| Kiss Me Deadly 
| Christina Bailey
|
|-
| 1956
| The Rack| Caroline
|
|-
| 1962
| The Chapman Report 
| Miss Selby
|
|-
| 1969 
| Butch Cassidy and the Sundance Kid 
| Agnes
|
|-
| rowspan=3|1970
| WUSA 
| Philomene
|
|-
| The People Next Door| Tina Hoffman
|
|-
| Lovers and Other Strangers| Bernice Henderson
|
|-
| rowspan=2|1971
| The Steagle 
| Rita Weiss
|
|-
| The Last Picture Show| Ruth Popper
|
|-
| rowspan=3|1973
| Charley and the Angel 
| Nettie Appleby
| 
|-
| Dillinger 
| Anna Sage
|
|-
| Happy Mother's Day, Love George 
| Ronda
|
|-
| rowspan=2|1974
| Daisy Miller 
| Mrs. Ezra Miller
|
|-
| Young Frankenstein 
|Frau Blücher
| 
|-
| 1975
| Crazy Mama| Melba Stokes
|
|-
| rowspan=2|1977
| The Mouse and His Child| Euterpe
| Voice
|-
| High Anxiety 
| Nurse Diesel
| 
|-
| rowspan=3|1979
|The North Avenue Irregulars| Claire Porter
|
|-
| The Muppet Movie 
| Lord's Secretary
|
|-
| Scavenger Hunt| Mildred Carruthers
|
|-
| rowspan=2|1980
| Herbie Goes Bananas| Aunt Louise Trends
|
|-
| Foolin' Around 
| Samantha
|
|-
| rowspan=3|1981
| Yesterday 
| Mrs. Kramer
| 
|-
| History of the World, Part I 
| Madame Defarge
|
|-
| My Strange Uncle|
| Short film
|-
| rowspan=3|1986
| Shadow Play| Millie Crown
|
|-
| My Little Pony: The Movie 
| Hydia
| Voice
|-
| Castle in the Sky 
| Dola
| Voice, English dub
|-
| rowspan=2|1987
| Hansel and Gretel 
| Griselda
|
|-
| Walk Like a Man 
| Margaret Shand
| 
|-
| 1988
| Going to the Chapel| Mrs. Haldane
|
|-
| 1989
| Prancer 
| Mrs. McFarland
|
|-
| 1990
| Texasville| Ruth Popper
|
|-
| rowspan=3|1991
| Love Hurts 
| Ruth Weaver
|
|-
| The Giant of Thunder Mountain 
| Narrator / The Elder Amy
|
|-
| Picture This 
| 
| Documentary
|-
| rowspan=2|1993
| My Boyfriend's Back 
| Maggie The Zombie Expert
|
|-
| The Beverly Hillbillies 
| Daisy May "Granny" Moses
|
|-
| 1994
| A Troll in Central Park 
| Gnorga  
| Voice
|-
| rowspan=2|1995
| Nobody's Girls: Five Women of the West 
|
| Documentary
|-
| Now and Then 
| Grandma Albertson
| 
|-
| rowspan=2|1996
|Beavis and Butt-Head Do America 
| Old Woman on Plane and Bus
| Voice
|-
| Never Too Late| Olive
|
|-
| 1997
| Annabelle's Wish| Aunt Agnes
| Voice
|-
| rowspan=3|1999
| Gen¹³  
| Helga
| Voice
|-
| The Iron Giant 
| Mrs. Tensedge
| Voice
|-
| Music of the Heart 
| Assunta Guaspari
| 
|-
| 2000
| Hanging Up| Pat Mozell
|
|-
| 2001
| The Amati Girls| Dolly Amati
|
|-
| 2002
| Manna from Heaven| Helen
|
|-
| rowspan=2|2003
| Alex & Emma 
| Grandmother
|
|-
| Bad Santa 
| Grandma
| Uncredited
|-
| 2004
| Spanglish| Evelyn Wright
|
|-
| rowspan=4|2005
| Buzz 
| 
| Documentary
|-
| The Longest Yard 
| Lynette
| 
|-
| Sky High| Nurse Spex
|
|-
| The Californians 
| Eileen Boatwright
|
|-
| rowspan=2|2006
| Scary Movie 4 
| Mrs. Norris
|
|-
| Beerfest 
| Great Gam Gam
|
|-
| rowspan=2|2008
| The Women| Maggie
|
|-
| New York, I Love You 
| Mitzie 
| Segment: "Joshua Marston"
|-
| rowspan=3|2009
| American Cowslip 
| Sandy
| 
|-
| Ponyo 
| Kayo 
| Voice, English dub
|-
| Inglourious Basterds 
| Mrs. Himmelstein
| Scenes cut
|-
| rowspan=2|2010
|Expecting Mary| Annie
| 
|-
| You Again 
| Helen Sullivan
| Uncredited
|-
| 2011
|The Fields 
| Gladys
|
|-
| rowspan=4|2012
| Gambit| Grandma Merle
|
|-
| Adult World| Mary Anne
|
|-
| The Oogieloves in the Big Balloon Adventure| Dottie Rounder
|
|-
| Foodfight!| Brand X Lunch Lady
| Voice
|-
| 2013
| The Croods| Gran
| Voice
|-
| rowspan=5|2015
| The Wedding Ringer| Grandma Palmer
|
|-
| This Is Happening| Estelle
|
|-
| Scouts Guide to the Zombie Apocalypse| Ms. Fielder
|
|-
| Unity| Narrator
| Documentary 
|- 
| Baby, Baby, Baby| Evelyn Zingerelli
|
|-
| rowspan=4|2016
| So B. It| Alice Wilinsky
| 
|-
| The Bronx Bull| Lillian Forrester
| 
|-
| The Comedian| May Conner
| 
|- 
| Recalculating| Texter
| Short film
|-
| 2017
| The Gilksmans| Helen Neuman
|
|-
| rowspan=3|2018
| I Can Only Imagine| Memaw Leona Millard
| 
|-
| Lez Bomb| Josephine
| 
|-
| It's Who You Know| Liz
| Short film
|-
| 2019
| When We Last Spoke| Itasca
|  
|-
| rowspan=2|2020
| The Croods: A New Age| Gran 
| Voice
|-
| Jump, Darling| Margaret
|
|- 
| rowspan=2|2021
| High Holiday| Nana
| Posthumous release
|- 
| Not to Forget| Donna
| Posthumous release; final film role
|- 
|}

Television

Television films

Theater
 Ah, Wilderness! (Des Moines, 1942)
 Blithe Spirit (Northwestern University, 1943)
 Sundown Beach (Broadway, 1948)
 South Pacific (Broadway, 1951; month-long replacement for Martha Wright)
 Come Back, Little Sheba (Pre-Broadway tryout, 1950; left cast to star in As You Like It)
 As You Like It (Broadway, 1950)
 A Story for a Sunday Evening (Broadway, 1950; Won Theatre World Award)
 Lo and Behold! (Broadway, 1952)
 Dear Barbarians (Broadway, 1952)
 Sunday Breakfast (Broadway, 1952)
 The Day Before Spring (Palm Beach, Florida, 1953)
 The Crucible (Broadway, 1953; replacement for Madeleine Sherwood)
 King of Hearts (Broadway, 1954)
 A Touch of the Poet (Broadway, 1958; replacement for Kim Stanley)
 Masquerade (Broadway, 1959)
 Twigs (Marriott Theater in Lincolnshire, Illinois, 1978)The Oldest Living Graduate (1980)
 Twigs (Drury Lane Theater, Water Tower Place, Chicago, Illinois 1981)
 High Spirits (Broadway opening eventually cancelled, 1981)
 A Couple of White Chicks Sitting Around Talking (Drury Lane Theater, Water Tower Place, Chicago, Illinois 1983)
 A Little Family Business (Drury Lane Oak Brook, Illinois, 1985)
 A Fatal Weakness (Monaco, 1985)
 Grandma Moses: An American Primitive (US national tour, 1989)
 Show Boat (US national tour, 1994)
 Young Frankenstein'' (workshop for the musical, 2006)

See also
List of awards and nominations received by Cloris Leachman

References

External links
 
 

Actress filmographies
American filmographies